The Jacksonville City Council is the legislative governing body of the city of Jacksonville, Florida. The council meets in its chambers at Jacksonville City Hall, 117 W. Duval St. Under Florida’s government transparency laws, all official council business must be conducted in meetings open to the public.

Composition
The Jacksonville City Council is composed of nineteen members who are elected for a four-year term and serve as part-time legislators.  In May of each year, the Council elects a President and Vice President to serve one-year terms beginning the first of July.

The nineteen members are not all elected in the same manner; some are elected from districts, and others are elected at large.  However, once elected, there is no distinction between council members elected at-large and from regular districts.  Both have equal rights and responsibilities.

Regular districts
The city is divided into 14 districts; each of these districts elects a single council member who resides in the district.  Like virtually all legislative districts at all levels in United States, these districts are redrawn every ten years following the decennial census.

At-large groups
In the early 1990s, voters approved an unusual residency requirement for "at-large" members.  The county was divided into five special districts unrelated to any other districts, solely for the purpose of providing better representation for all geographical areas of Jacksonville. This was done because a trend had developed in which all five "at large" councilmembers actually resided in one small area of town.  So under the current structure, at-large council members must reside in the special district for which they are running, but are elected by the voters of the county as a whole.

One at-large seat was vacated in 2007 because of a violation of this residency requirement; "Jay" Jabour was elected as the at-large councilman from the 2nd special district, but evidence later arose indicating that he actually lived in the 3rd special district.  A judge subsequently invalidated the election, and the seat became vacant. Currently, one of the at-large seats is vacant following the death of Tommy Hazouri, pending the results of a runoff between Democrat Tracye Polson and Republican Nick Howland on February 22, 2022.

Party affiliation
Currently the council has five Democrats and fourteen Republicans serving.

Committees
The Council President assigns members to committees and to act as council liaisons.

There are six standing committees: 
Finance 
Land Use & Zoning 
Public Health & Safety
Rules
Transportation, Energy & Utilities
Neighborhoods, Community Investments & Services Committee

There is one special committee: 
Personnel Committee

There are three council boards & commissions:
Duval County Tourist Development Council
Jacksonville Waterways Commission
Value Adjustment Board

Awards and criticism
The Charles D. Webb Award is given annually by outgoing council President for the most effective councilman, i.e. most helpful to the council and constituents. After the 1988 death of Claude Yates, known as the father of Jacksonville’s consolidation, the Jacksonville City Council created the Claude J. Yates Outstanding Councilman of the Year Award, which is bestowed annually to an exemplary council member. The council created the John E. Goode Award for best council debater in 1997. The Mary L. Singleton Award is given to the member with the most difficult committee assignment during the year.

In late 2007, a Grand Jury announced that it would probe alleged Sunshine Law violations by the Jacksonville City Council. While the Grand Jury found numerous instances of violation of the law, they decided against issuing any indictments when they issued their final report in January 2008.

In January 2010, District 13 Council member John Meserve was suspended by Florida Governor Charlie Crist after being charged with conducting real estate transactions without a license.
Art Graham, who resigned the seat in 2009 to unsuccessfully run for state senate, was appointed by the governor on February 12, 2010 to replace John Meserve, who is fighting a felony charge. In May 2018, two Council members, Reggie Brown and Katrina Brown, were indicted by a federal grand jury on conspiracy to commit mail and wire fraud.

City Council members

References

External links
City of Jacksonville Council Homepage

Government of Jacksonville, Florida
Florida city councils
Government in the Jacksonville metropolitan area